John Crozier may refer to:
 John Crozier (archbishop of Armagh) (1858–1920), Anglican bishop in Ireland, father of the below
 John Crozier (bishop of Tuam, Killala and Achonry) (1879–1966), Anglican bishop in Ireland, son of the above
 John Crozier (politician) (1814–1887) Australian pastoralist and member of South Australian Legislative Council
 John Hervey Crozier (1812–1889), American politician